Tyson Veidt  is an American football coach and former player. He is the associate head and linebackers coach at Iowa State University. Veidt served as the head football coach at Bluffton from 208 to 2013, compiling a record of 36-70. He was previously an assistant coach at Toledo for two seasons under Matt Campbell.

Playing career
A native of Logan, Ohio, Veidt graduated from Logan High School in 1992 and earned a bachelor's degree in pre-physical therapy from Muskingum College in 1996. Veidt was a two year starter and three year letter winner as well as graduating cum laude from Muskingum.

Coaching career

Assistant coach
Veidt served as a graduate assistant at Indiana before returning to his alma mater to serve as defensive coordinator, he held this position from 2000 until 2003. He then worked under Rich Rodriguez at West Virginia as a defensive GA. He earned a master's degree in athletic coaching education at WVU in 2005. Veidt then coached two seasons at Saint Vincent College as defensive coordinator before accepting the head coaching position at Bluffton in 2008.

Following his head coaching stint at Bluffton, Veidt coaching linebackers as well as serving as the recruiting coordinator at Toledo. At UT in 2014, he coaching first team All-MAC and future NFL linebacker Junior Sylvestre.

In January 2016 when Matt Campbell at Iowa State Veidt followed him to serve in as the assistant head coach in addition to coaching linebackers again. One of Veidt’s biggest accomplishments is transforming Joel Lanning into a First-Team All-American linebacker. Lanning, who hadn’t played linebacker since eighth grade, was a quarterback in his first four seasons as a Cyclone before switching over to linebacker in his final season. Veidt was a nominee for the Broyles Award and was named the Linebackers Coach of the Year by FootballScoop in 2017. He has coach two All-American Linebackers in Joel Lanning (2017) and Mike Rose (2020).

Head coach
Veidt was named Bluffton's head football coach on January 3, 2008.  He led the Beavers to 5-5 in 2011 and 6-4 in 2012, finishing 5-3 in the conference both seasons as well. The team broke 40 school records during his time. Veidt also won four straight wins over rival Defiance College.

His team excelled in the classroom as well. The Bluffton football team recorded the highest GPA in school history in 2012.

Head coaching record

References

External links

 Iowa State profile

Living people
Indiana Hoosiers football coaches
Iowa State Cyclones football coaches
West Virginia Mountaineers football coaches
Muskingum Fighting Muskies football players
Toledo Rockets football coaches
People from Logan County, Ohio
Players of American football from Ohio
Year of birth missing (living people)